The year 1821 in archaeology involved some significant events.

Explorations
 October - John Gardner Wilkinson begins a twelve-year stay in Egypt, surveying historical sites.

Excavations

Publications

Finds
'Gallagh Man', an Iron Age bog body, is found in County Galway, Ireland.

Awards

Miscellaneous
"Egyptian Hall" in London displays artifacts from Ancient Egypt brought to the United Kingdom by Giovanni Battista Belzoni. The Philae obelisk is landed in England in December.
While not specifically the year 1821, this time period is when one of the most significant categorical discoveries of archaeology was named. Christian Thomsen, a Danish archaeologist, developed the three age system to date objects in museums. These three ages were the "Stone Age," "Bronze Age," and "Iron Age." 
While not specifically the year 1821, this time period is when one of the most significant findings regarding time and dating archaeological findings was discovered. Boucher de Perthes established a much deeper sense of time than what James Usher had previously established. Perthes determined that the world was significantly older than 4004 BC and thus gave archaeology a deeper, more realistic time frame to work with.

Births

 June 21, 1821- The birth of Ephraim George Squier, co-author of "Ancient Monuments of the Mississippi Valley" along with Edwin Hamilton Davis.

Deaths

See also
Ancient Egypt / Egyptology

References

Archaeology
Archaeology by year
Archaeology
Archaeology